Jenna Marston (born July 16, 1991) is a member of the United States women's national baseball team which won a gold medal at the 2015 Pan American Games.

Playing career

Baseball
At Principia High School in Missouri, she played on the boys' varsity baseball team with her brother Christopher. Before high school, she was on a travel team with the St. Louis Amateur Baseball Association.

Playing for Team USA at the 2010 Women's Baseball World Cup, she logged a .593 batting average, second highest among all players. She led all Team USA players in the tournament with 16 hits and eight doubles.

Softball
Earning a softball scholarship at the University of Missouri, she played catcher, outfield and shortstop.

Awards and honors
 2010 USA Baseball Sportswoman of the Year
 2011 John E Wray Award (awarded at the St. Louis Baseball Writers' Dinner)
 2011 Premier Player of College Softball as voted by the fans.

References

1991 births
Living people
American female baseball players
Baseball players at the 2015 Pan American Games
Missouri Tigers softball players
Pan American Games gold medalists for the United States
Pan American Games medalists in baseball
Medalists at the 2015 Pan American Games